Mundari (Munɖari) is a Munda language of the Austroasiatic language family spoken by the Munda tribes in eastern Indian states of Jharkhand, Odisha and West Bengal. It is closely related to Santali. Mundari Bani, a script specifically to write Mundari, was invented by Rohidas Singh Nag. It has also been written in the Devanagari, Odia, Bengali, and Latin writing systems.

History
According to linguist Paul Sidwell (2018), Munda languages probably arrived on coast of Odisha from Indochina about 4000–3500 years ago and spread after Indo-Aryan migration to Odisha.

Geographical distribution
Mundari is spoken in the Ranchi, Khunti, Seraikela Kharsawan and West Singhbhum, East Singhbhum district of Jharkhand, and in the Mayurbhanj, Kendujhar, Baleshwar, Sundargarh district of Odisha by at least 1.1 million people. Another 500,000, mainly in Odisha and Assam, are recorded in the census as speaking "Munda," potentially another name for Mundari.

Dialects
Toshiki Osada (2008:99), citing the Encyclopaedia Mundarica (vol. 1, p. 6), lists the following dialects of Mundari, which are spoken mostly in Jharkhand state.
Hasada: east of the Ranchi-Chaibasa Road
Naguri: west of the Ranchi-Chaibasa Road
Tamaria or Latar: Panchpargana area (Tamar, Bundu, Rahe, Sonahatu, Silli)
Kera: ethnic Oraon who live in the Ranchi city area

Bhumij, listed in many sources as a separate language, may in fact be a variety of the Latar (Tamaria) dialect of Mundari. It is spoken across Jharkhand state and in Mayurbhanj district, Odisha (Anderson 2008:196). There may be around 50,000 Bhumij speakers, although the census records around 27,000.

Phonology
The phonology of Mundari is similar to the surrounding closely related Austroasiatic languages but considerably different from either Indo-Aryan or Dravidian. Perhaps the most foreign phonological influence has been on the vowels. Whereas the branches of Austroasiatic in Southeast Asia are rich in vowel phonemes, Mundari has only five. The consonant inventory of Mundari is similar to other Austroasiatic languages with the exception of retroflex consonants, which seem to appear only in loanwords. (Osada 2008)

Vowels
Mundari has five vowel phonemes. All vowels have long and short as well as nasalized allophones, but neither length nor nasality are contrastive. Vowels preceding or following  are also nasalized.

Consonants
Mundari's consonant inventory consists of 23 basic phonemes. The Naguri and Kera dialects include aspirated stops as additional phonemes, here enclosed in parentheses.

Counting

Relations

Verb

Writing system

Mandari is also written in native Mundari Bani, invented in the 1980s by Rohidas Singh Nag.

Notes

References

Anderson, Gregory D.S (ed). 2008. The Munda languages. Routledge Language Family Series 3.New York: Routledge. .
Osada Toshiki. 2008. "Mundari". In Anderson, Gregory D.S (ed). The Munda languages, 99–164. Routledge Language Family Series 3.New York: Routledge. .
8.https://omniglot.com/writing/mundaribani.htm
9.https://omniglot.com/writing/mundari.htm

Further reading
Evans, Nicholas & Toshki Osada. 2005a. Mundari: the myth of a language without word classes. In Linguistic Typology 9.3, pp. 351–390.
Evans, Nicholas & Toshki Osada. 2005b. Mundari and argumentation in word-class analysis. In Linguistic Typology 9.3, pp. 442–457
Hengeveld, Kees & Jan Rijkhoff. 2005. Mundari as a flexible language. In Linguistic Typology 9.3, pp. 406–431.
Newberry, J. (2000). North Munda dialects: Mundari, Santali, Bhumia. Victoria, B.C.: J. Newberry.

Texts

External links
 Mundari Bibliography at Department of Linguistics, University of Osnabrueck, Germany
 Detailed language map of eastern Nepal, see language #68 in green along eastern border
 http://projekt.ht.lu.se/rwaai RWAAI (Repository and Workspace for Austroasiatic Intangible Heritage)
 http://hdl.handle.net/10050/00-0000-0000-0003-A6AA-C@view Mundari language in RWAAI Digital Archive
 https://www.unicode.org/L2/L2021/21031r-mundari.pdf

Munda languages
Languages of Bangladesh
Languages of India
Languages of Jharkhand
Languages of Odisha
Languages of Nepal
Endangered languages of India

ca:Llengües kolàries